Tomo-chūō Station is a HRT station on Astram Line, located in 4219-11, Tomo, Numata-cho, Asaminami-ku, Hiroshima.

Platforms

Connections
█ Astram Line
●Ōbara — ●Tomo-chūō — ●Ōzuka

Around station
Hiroshima Expressway

History
Opened on August 20, 1994.

See also
Astram Line
Hiroshima Rapid Transit

References 

Astram Line stations